Joël Thierry Retornaz (born 30 September 1983 in Chêne-Bougeries, Genève, Switzerland) is an Italian curler from Cembra. He was the skip of the Italian men's Olympic curling team in 2006, 2018, and 2022.

Retornaz gained sudden renown in Italy during the 2006 Winter Olympics. Although Italy has little curling tradition, and the sport was practiced only by a few hundred amateurs, Retornaz led the semi-professional Italian team to several unexpected victories over strong teams, including Canada. This breakthrough inspired a sudden national curiosity for curling, previously almost unknown in Italy.

Retornaz returned to the Olympics in 2018, skipping the Italians again while throwing third rocks. The team finished 9th with a 3-6 record. The team finished 3–6 again at the 2022 Olympics, placing 9th again.

Retornaz has represented Italy in eight World Curling Championships, in 2005, 2010, 2015, 2017, 2018, 2019, 2021, and 2022, skipping the team in each event except 2005. Their best record was a bronze medal at the 2022 World Men's Curling Championship, Italy's first medal at the men's worlds. 

Retronaz has competed for Italy in 14 European Curling Championships (as of 2022), finally winning a bronze medal in his 11th try in 2018, skipping the rink of Amos Mosaner, Sebastiano Arman, Simone Gonin and Fabio Ribotta. Retornaz won a second bronze in 2021 and a third in 2022.

Personal life
In addition to curling, Retornaz breeds and races quarter horses. He is employed as a businessman. He is currently married and lives in Lugano, Switzerland.

Grand Slam record
Retornaz won Italy's first Grand Slam championship at the 2022 Masters.

References

External links

Italian male curlers
Curlers at the 2006 Winter Olympics
Curlers at the 2018 Winter Olympics
1983 births
Living people
Italian people of Swiss descent
Olympic curlers of Italy
Sportspeople from the canton of Geneva
Sportspeople from Trentino
Sportspeople from Lugano
Italian expatriate sportspeople in Switzerland
Curlers at the 2022 Winter Olympics